Myth is an interactive fiction game by Magnetic Scrolls released in 1989. Some versions have static graphics. The game was only released in limited numbers to members of the Official Secrets adventuring club.

Plot
Zeus has ordered the gods of Olympus to perform various tasks to impress humanity. As Poseidon, the player's mission is to steal the Helmet of Invisibility from Hades.

References

External links
 
 Myth at Lemon 64
 Myth at Lemon Amiga
 

1980s interactive fiction
1989 video games
Amiga games
Amstrad PCW games
Atari ST games
Commodore 64 games
DOS games
Magnetic Scrolls games
Single-player video games
Video games based on Greek mythology
Video games developed in the United Kingdom
ZX Spectrum games